This is a list of wars involving the Republic of Djibouti.

References

Citations

 
Djibouti
Wars